Perss (stands for Persatuan Sepakbola Soe) is a Indonesian football team based in Puspenmas Soe Field, Soe, South Central Timor Regency, East Nusa Tenggara. This team competes in Liga 3 East Nusa Tenggara Zone.

References

External links

Football clubs in East Nusa Tenggara